This article features the 2007 U-20 World Cup CONCACAF qualifying tournament qualifying stage. Caribbean and Central American teams entered in separate tournaments. The North American team the United States automatically qualified, as well as main tournament hosts Mexico (North America) and Panama (Central America). 23 Caribbean teams entered, of which 3 qualified and 6 Central American teams entered, of which 2 qualified.

Caribbean

First round
Haiti, Jamaica and Trinidad and Tobago received a bye for this round.

Group A
All matches were played in the U.S. Virgin Islands.

Group B
All matches were played in the Dominican Republic.

Group C
All matches were played in Saint Martin.

Group D
All matches were played in Saint Lucia.

Group E
All matches were played in Suriname.

Final round
Group winners qualified directly for the main tournament. Group runners-up played each other in a final play-off.

Group A
All matches were played in Trinidad and Tobago.

Group B
All matches were played in Haiti.

Second-place play-off

|}

Central America

Group A

Group B

Qualified for Main Tournament
  (Caribbean winners)
  (Caribbean winners)
  (Caribbean third place)
  (Central American winners)
  (Central American winners)

See also
 2007 U-20 World Cup CONCACAF qualifying tournament

External links
Results by RSSSF

2007 CONCACAF U-20 Championship
CONCACAF U-20 Championship qualification